Chinese Taipei competed at the 2000 Summer Paralympics in Sydney, Australia. The country took a gold medal won by Chiang Chih Chung in the men's F13 javelin throw event. Chih threw a distance of 57.28 metres to win the competition and broke the world record in the process. The Chinese Taipei team also won two silvers and two bronze medals in table tennis.

Medallists

See also
Chinese Taipei at the 2000 Summer Olympics
Chinese Taipei at the Paralympics

References

Nations at the 2000 Summer Paralympics
2000
Paralympics